George Yates (21 August 1858 — 21 July 1933) was an English cricketer who played first-class cricket for Derbyshire in 1883.

Yates was born at Bolsover, Derbyshire and became a coal miner. Yates played one first-class match for Derbyshire in the 1883 season, against Marylebone Cricket Club in July, which finished in a draw. He was a right-handed batsman and scored no runs in his only first-class innings. He was a right-arm round-arm bowler and did not take a wicket in the three overs he bowled.

Yates died at Bolsover at the age of 74.

References

1858 births
1933 deaths
Derbyshire cricketers
English cricketers
People from Bolsover
Cricketers from Derbyshire